

The 31st SS Volunteer Grenadier Division ( was a unit of the German armed forces during World War II. It was formed from the Hungarian Volksdeutsche (ethnic Germans), mostly from the Bačka in September 1944. By November 1944 it was in action on the Hungarian Front.

In January 1945 it was sent to Austria and reformed as a type 45 Division, with only two battalions in each regiment and only three platoons in each company. The division then joined the 17th Army in Silesia where it was surrounded by the Red Army; it surrendered near Hradec Králové in May 1945.

Commander
Gustav Lombard  (1 October 1944 – April 1945)
Wilhelm Trabandt (April 1945 – May 8, 1945) (?)

Order of battle
SS Volunteer Grenadier Regiment 78
SS Volunteer Grenadier Regiment 79
SS Volunteer Grenadier Regiment 80 (this unit was destroyed and reformed using the Brizen SS Police Regiment in 1945)
SS Artillerie Regiment 31
SS Füsilier Battalion 31 (this unit was destroyed in Hungary and replaced using the 'Szálasi' Hungarian SS Grenadier Battalion in March 1945)
SS Signals Battalion 31
SS Nachschub Troop 31
SS Panzerjäger Battalion 31
SS Pionier Battalion 31
SS Krankentransport Kompanie 31
SS Vetinerary Company 31

See also
List of German divisions in World War II
List of Waffen-SS divisions
List of SS personnel

References

Footnotes

Bibliography

31
Military units and formations established in 1944
Infantry divisions of the Waffen-SS
Military units and formations disestablished in 1945